Barranco, which is Spanish for "ravine", may refer to:

Places
Barranco, Belize, a village in Toledo District, Belize
Barranco, Spain, a village south of Jijona, Alicante, Spain
Barranco District, Peru
Barranco de Loba, Colombia

Persons 
 Bruno Barranco (born 1997), Argentine football (soccer) player
María Barranco (born 1961), Spanish actress
Javi Barranco (born 1987), Spanish football (soccer) player
Juan Barranco, pseudonym of Spanish comic book artist Óscar Jiménez
 Juan Barranco Gallardo, mayor of Madrid 1986–1989
 Dr. Crispin Barranco,(Filipino, born 1925) Physician

See also 
 Barranca (disambiguation)
 Barrancos

Spanish words and phrases